Marčana is a village and municipality in the southern part of Istria, Croatia, 15 km northeast of Pula. The village is situated on the D66 state road (Pula - Rijeka).

Marčana is over 3000 years old and preserves old Croatian culture. There are many rustic houses. There are old and damaged houses, as well as new and renovated houses. The village has markets, a pizzeria and three local pubs.

Villages

References

External links
 Marčana Official website
 www.marcana.info Local Information website
 Overall tourist offer of Marcana

Municipalities of Croatia
Populated places in Istria County